"Flash Pose" is a song by Brazilian singer and drag queen Pabllo Vittar featuring English singer-songwriter Charli XCX. It was released on 25 July 2019 as the lead single off of Vittar's 111 1 EP and 111 album. The track is Charli XCX and Vittar's second collaboration, following "I Got It", which appears on Charli's Pop 2 mixtape and is followed by "Shake It", on the album Charli.

Background 
In an interview with Billboard, Vittar explained her inspiration behind making the song entirely in English, saying "I did a Pride tour in the U.S. and Canada this year, and there were a lot of fans there. They try to learn Portuguese so they can sing and communicate with me, so it's time for me to learn to speak their language too, right?"

Composition 
"Flash Pose" is Vittar's first English-language track. Musically, it is a "self-assured, club-ready" electropop composition influenced by house music and "inspired by the global Pride parades at which [Vittar] performs". It features a "percussive, electronic-tinged chorus", "driving" beats and "a roiling verse about wearing vintage Versace and party-hopping in a bright pink car  Malibu Barbie" by Charli XCX. Thaís Matos of Brazilian website G1 noted the absence of the tecnobrega or funk sound Vittar's previous releases incorporated.

Music video 
The "Flash Pose" music video premiered one day after the song on the Grindr app, and later, on YouTube.

Critical reception 
Mike Wass of Idolator called the song a highlight on its parent album. Suzy Exposito of Rolling Stone placed the music video on a list of the 10 best Latin music videos of July. Alex Blynn praised the single, writing: "The track feels eminently danceable, fun as hell and offer[ing] a new take on classic Pabllo-sounds".

Release history

Certifications

References 

Pabllo Vittar songs
Charli XCX songs
2019 songs
2019 singles
Songs written by Charli XCX